Stenomordella is a genus of beetles in the family Mordellidae, containing the following species:

 Stenomordella longeantennalis Ermisch, 1941
 Stenomordella macrocephala Franciscolo, 1965
 Stenomordella ochii Kiyoyama, 1975

References

Mordellidae